Luke, the Candy Cut-Up is a 1916 American short comedy film starring Harold Lloyd. A print of the film survives in George Eastman House.

Cast
 Harold Lloyd - Lonesome Luke
 Snub Pollard
 Gene Marsh
 Bebe Daniels
 Sammy Brooks
 Billy Fay
 Fred C. Newmeyer
 Charles Stevenson

See also
 Harold Lloyd filmography

References

External links

1916 films
1916 comedy films
Silent American comedy films
American black-and-white films
Films directed by Hal Roach
Lonesome Luke films
1916 short films
American silent short films
American comedy short films
1910s American films